Jean Ginibre (4 March 1938 — 26 March 2020) was a French mathematical physicist. He is known for his contributions to  random matrix theory (see circular law), statistical mechanics (see FKG inequality, Ginibre inequality), and partial differential equations. With Martine Le Berre and Yves Pomeau, he provided a kinetic theory for the emission of photons by an atom maintained in an excited state by an intense field that creates Rabi oscillations. He received the Paul Langevin Prize in 1969.

Jean Ginibre was Emeritus Professor at Paris-Sud 11 University. He directed the thesis of Monique Combescure.

See also
Classical XY model

References

1938 births
2020 deaths
French mathematicians
French physicists
Mathematical physicists